East Torrens is a Baseball club playing in the South Australian Baseball League. Known as the Redsox, their home ground is Patterson Reserve in Payneham.

External links
East Torrens Baseball Club

Australian baseball clubs
Sporting clubs in Adelaide